The FIS Nordic World Ski Championships 1978 took place February 18–26, 1978 in Lahti, Finland. This was Lahti's record fourth time hosting the event after previously doing so in 1926, 1938, and 1958. The women's 20 km event was added.

Men's cross-country

15 km 
February 21, 1978

30 km 
February 19, 1978

50 km 
February 26, 1978

4 × 10 km relay
February 23, 1978

Women's cross-country

5 km 
February 20, 1978

10 km 
February 18, 1978

20 km 
February 25, 1978

4 × 5 km relay
February 22, 1978

Men's Nordic combined

Individual 
February 19–20, 1978

Men's ski jumping

Individual normal hill 
February 18, 1978

Individual large hill 
February 25, 1978

Team large hill (unofficial) 
February 22, 1978. No medals awarded.

Medal table

References
FIS 1978 Cross country results
FIS 1978 Nordic combined results
FIS 1978 Ski jumping results
Results from German Wikipedia

FIS Nordic World Ski Championships
Nordic Skiing
1978 in Nordic combined
1978 in Finland
February 1978 sports events in Europe
Nordic skiing competitions in Finland
Sports competitions in Lahti